Traiguén Airport is an airport serving Traiguén, a city in the La Araucanía Region of Chile.

See also

Transport in Chile
List of airports in Chile

References

External links
OpenStreetMap - Traiguén Airport
OurAirports - Traiguén Airport
SkyVector - Traiguén Airport
FallingRain - Traiguén Airport

Airports in Chile
Airports in La Araucanía Region